These Two Windows is the debut studio album by the American singer Alec Benjamin. It was released by Warner Music on May 29, 2020. It reached number 75 on the Billboard 200.

Commercial performance 
On the UK Albums Chart, These Two Windows debuted at No. 52 with 1,677 sales units, marking Benjamin's first entry on that chart.

Track listing

Charts

References 

2020 debut albums
Albums produced by Alex Hope (songwriter)
Alec Benjamin albums
Warner Music Group albums